This is a list for the individuals that Pope Pius X (r. 1903–14) beatified throughout his pontificate; the pope beatified 131 in total.

See also
 List of people beatified by Pope Benedict XV
 List of people beatified by Pope Pius XI
 List of people beatified by Pope Pius XII
 List of people beatified by Pope John XXIII
 List of people beatified by Pope Paul VI
 List of people beatified by Pope John Paul II
 List of people beatified by Pope Benedict XVI
 List of people beatified by Pope Francis

1900s-related lists
1910s-related lists

Pius X